Doris Eunice Dlakude, also sometimes spelled Dorris or Dorries, is a South African politician who has been a Member of Parliament (MP) for the African National Congress.

References

External links 

 
 Ms Doris Eunice Dlakude at South African Parliament

Living people
Members of the National Assembly of South Africa
Women members of the National Assembly of South Africa
African National Congress politicians
21st-century South African women politicians
21st-century South African politicians
Year of birth missing (living people)